Steven Spielberg's Director's Chair is a simulation video game created and published by Knowledge Adventure for Windows and Macintosh. It was released in 1996 in the United States.

In the game, the player is guided by film director Steven Spielberg (appearing as himself) through the process of moviemaking, including scriptwriting, filming, and editing, using pre-generated film clips featuring Jennifer Aniston, Quentin Tarantino, Katherine Helmond, and Penn & Teller, among others. The game features advice from Hollywood professionals such as editor Michael Kahn, special effects supervisor Michael Lantieri, and cinematographer Dean Cundey. The game was produced by Roger Holzberg, who directed Spielberg in scenes in which Spielberg himself appeared.

Plot 
The player begins with a small budget and a personal assistant who provides guidance. Spielberg gives a pep talk to the player before the first feature can be made. Ted and Terry (or Terry and Ted) offer the player useful suggestions on changing the film's script. Delays can occur during the filmmaking process. Ultimately, the player works with actor Quentin Tarantino and actress Jennifer Aniston, as well as Penn & Teller. Cinematographer Dean Cundey also works on the player's film to keep it within budget.

The film is then edited by the player, who can choose which angles to use, and can add sound effects and a soundtrack. Spielberg then presents the film at its premiere. The studio sometimes offers the player a chance to make the film again with a larger budget. Script and shot options increase as the player advances in experience.

The short film within the game concerns a prisoner on death row (Tarantino) sentenced to death for the killing of an old lady (Katherine Helmond). His partner (Aniston) sets out to clear his name by investigating a pair of sinister magicians (Penn & Teller). The virtual budget of the game is $40 million.

Reception 

Computer Gaming World rated the game two and a half stars out of five. AllGame rated the game three stars out of five.

In 2020, Molleindustria released a free browser version of the short film within the game, presented as a simplified interactive movie similar to Black Mirror: Bandersnatch, or Mosaic.

See also 
 The Movies

References

External links 
 

1996 video games
Filmmaking video games
Classic Mac OS games
North America-exclusive video games
Steven Spielberg
Video games developed in the United States
DreamWorks Interactive games
Windows games
Single-player video games